Lingarajpally is a village in Yadadri district in Andhra Pradesh, India. It falls under Atmakur mandal.

References

Villages in Yadadri Bhuvanagiri district